was a Japanese economic historian. Noro was born in Hokkaido in 1900. He studied at Keio Gijuku University, where he first became involved in radical politics. He worked for a labour research institute following graduation. In 1930 he joined the Japanese Communist Party. He was instrumental in laying the foundations for the Koza school, a branch of Japanese Marxist thought.

Noro was arrested in November 1933. He died on 19 February 1934, in Shinagawa Police Station. His death was the result of police torture.

Works
 Nihon Shihonshugi Hattatsushi (History of the Development of Japanese Capitalism) (1930)

See also
 Japanese dissidence during the Shōwa period

References

1900 births
1934 deaths
People from Hokkaido
Japanese communists
Date of birth missing